Brasina is a village in Serbia. It is situated in the Mali Zvornik municipality, in the Mačva District of Central Serbia. The village has a Serb ethnic majority with a population of 1,663 (2002 census).

Historical population

1948: 953
1953: 1,098
1961: 1,303
1971: 1,410
1981: 1,497
1991: 1,592
2002: 1,663

References

See also
List of places in Serbia

Populated places in Mačva District